Mad Butcher is the second EP by German thrash metal band Destruction, released on March 6, 1987. Tommy had left the band and two new members had entered the group: a new drummer, Olli, and a new guitarist, Harry. This is the band's first studio recording featuring a four-piece band lineup, instead of a usual trio.

"Mad Butcher," the first song of the album, is a Destruction classic, but this revision is faster, with double solos from Harry and Mike.  The second song "The Damned" is a cover song from The Plasmatics. The third song "Reject Emotions" is a power ballad. Finally, "The Last Judgement" is an instrumental song played by Harry.

Track listing

Personnel
Destruction
 Schmier - bass, vocals
 Harry Wilkens - lead guitar
 Mike Sifringer - rhythm guitar
 Oliver "Olli" Kaiser  - drums

Production
Sebastian Krüger - cover painting
Kalle Trapp - producer, mixing, recording

See also
 Peter Leitch (Mad Butcher) - a famous New Zealander who runs a chain butcher outlets called The Mad Butcher

References 

1987 EPs
Destruction (band) albums
SPV/Steamhammer EPs
Thrash metal EPs